Microgeshna is a genus of moths of the family Crambidae. It contains only one species, Microgeshna laportei, which is found on the Seychelles, where it has been recorded from Aldabra.

References

Spilomelinae
Crambidae genera
Taxa named by Eugene G. Munroe
Monotypic moth genera